Wülzburg is a historical fortress of the Renaissance-age in Germany.

It is one of the best-preserved Renaissance fortresses in Germany. Today it is as Ortsteil (locality) a part of the city of Weißenburg. It was converted into a fortress from 1588 to 1605 by George Frederick, Margrave of Brandenburg-Ansbach.

In the 19th century it was a garrison of the Bavarian Army. During World War I, Charles DeGaulle was imprisoned at the Wülzburg. The Nazis also used it as a prison camp during World War II; it was here that the Czech composer Erwin Schulhoff was held for over a year before he died of TB. After the war it was a refugee camp.

Notes

External links 
 Wülzburg website 

Castles in Bavaria
Buildings and structures in Weißenburg-Gunzenhausen
Forts in Germany
Renaissance architecture in Germany
Benedictine monasteries in Germany
Collegiate churches in Germany
Buildings and structures completed in the 17th century
Charles de Gaulle
Weißenburg-Gunzenhausen
Refugee camps in Europe